DUCS  or Ducs may refer to:
 DUCS (software) or Display Unit Control System, a local teleprocessing package
 Dept. of Computer Science, University of Delhi

From duc
 Ducs d'Angers, a French ice hockey team
 Ducs de Dijon, a French ice hockey team
 Ducs de Longueuil, a Canadian junior baseball team
 Ducs Decazes, a French nobleman

See also
 DUC (disambiguation)